Natural gums are polysaccharides of natural origin, capable of causing a large increase in a solution's viscosity, even at small concentrations. They are mostly botanical gums, found in the woody elements of plants or in seed coatings.

Human uses
They are used in the food industry as thickening agents, gelling agents, emulsifying agents, and stabilizers, and in other industrial adhesives, binding agents, crystal inhibitors, clarifying agents, encapsulating agents, flocculating agents, swelling agents, foam stabilizers, etc. When consumed by humans, many of these gums are fermented by the microbes that inhabit the lower gastrointestinal tract (microbiome) and may influence the ecology and functions of these microscopic communities.

Examples
Natural gums can be classified according to their origin. They can also be classified as uncharged or ionic polymers (polyelectrolytes). Examples include (with E number food additive code):

References

Food additives

Chewing gum
Edible thickening agents
Polysaccharides